The 1993–94 Courage League National Division Two was the seventh full season of rugby union within the second tier of the English league system, currently known as the RFU Championship. Following the reduction of teams playing in National Division Two from thirteen to ten, only five teams remained from the previous season. They were Moseley, Nottingham, Sale, Wakefield and Waterloo. Four teams, London Scottish, Rugby, Saracens and West Hartlepool were relegated from Division One and one team Otley, making their debut, promoted from Division Three. This was the first full season of each team playing home and away matches against each of the other teams, to give eighteen matches each. 

Sale, the champions, were promoted to the Courage League National Division One for season 1994–95 along with the runners–up West Hartlepool. It was Sale's sixth attempt at returning to the top level whilst West Hartlepool go back up at the first attempt. Otley finished last and were relegated to Courage League National Division Three in 1994–95 along with Rugby who finish one place above them. Both teams had been promoted the previous season.

Participating teams

Table

Sponsorship
National Division Two is part of the Courage Clubs Championship and is sponsored by Courage Brewery

See also
 English rugby union system

References

N2
RFU Championship seasons